Anthony or Antony or Tony Wright may refer to:

Anthony
 Anthony Wright (American football) (born 1976), retired NFL quarterback
 Anthony Wright (field hockey) (born 1984), Canadian field hockey player, 2008 Olympian

Antony
 Antony Grey, pseudonym for Anthony Edgar Gartside Wright (1927–2010), British author and civil rights activist

Tony
 Tony Wright (actor) (1925–1986), English actor, married to Janet Munro
 Tony Wright (artist) (born 1949), produced images for Bob Dylan, Bob Marley and Traffic
 Tony Wright (Cannock Chase MP) (born 1948), former British Labour Party Member of Parliament for Cannock Chase
 Tony Wright (cricketer) (born 1962), English cricketer
 Tony Wright (Great Yarmouth MP) (born 1954), former British Labour Party Member of Parliament for Great Yarmouth
 Tony Wright (musician) (born 1968), lead singer of the UK band Terrorvision
 Tony Wright (Vanuatu) (born 1960), Member of the Cabinet of Vanuatu for Youth and Sports
 Tony Wright (sleep deprivation), English author and consciousness researcher

See also
 VerseChorusVerse, Northern Irish musician, real name Tony Wright